Archduke Hubert Salvator of Austria, Prince of Tuscany (30 April 1894 – 24 March 1971) was a member of the Tuscan line of the House of Habsburg and Archduke of Austria, Prince of Tuscany by birth.

Life
Salvator was born in Schloss Lichtenegg, Wels, Upper Austria, Austria-Hungary, the third child and second-eldest son of Archduke Franz Salvator of Austria, Prince of Tuscany and his wife Archduchess Marie Valerie of Austria. Through his mother, Hubert Salvator was a grandson of Franz Joseph I of Austria, and through his father, he was a great-grandson of Leopold II, Grand Duke of Tuscany.

Hubert Salvator married Princess Rosemary of Salm-Salm, second eldest child and daughter of Emanuel Alfred, Hereditary Prince of Salm-Salm and his wife Archduchess Maria Christina of Austria, on 25 November 1926 civilly in Anholt and religiously on 26 November 1926.

The archduke died at Schloss Persenbeug, Persenbeug-Gottsdorf, Lower Austria, Austria, aged 76.

Issue
Hubert Salvator and Rosemary had thirteen children together:

Archduke Friedrich Salvator of Austria (27 November 1927 – 26 March 1999) married Countess Margarethe Kalnoky de Korospatak
Archduke Leopold Salvator of Austria (16 October 1956)
Archduchess Marie Bernadette of Austria (10 February 1958) married Rupert Wolff and has issue
Archduke Alexander Salvator of Austria (12 April 1959) married Countess Marie Gabriele von Waldstein on 5 June 1993
Archduchess Annabella of Austria (5 September 1997)
Archduchess Tara of Austria (6 February 2000)
Archduke Constantin of Austria (4 January 2002)
Archduke Paul Salvator (4 November 2003)
Archduchess Katharina of Austria (1 November 1960) married Niall Brooks on 9 April 1988 and has issue.
Archduchess Agnes Christina of Austria (14 December 1928 – 31 August 2007)
Archduchess Maria Margaretha of Austria (born 29 January 1930)
Archduchess Maria Ludovica of Austria (31 January 1931 – 17 April 1999)
Archduchess Maria Adelheid of Austria (28 July 1933 – 10 October 2021)
Archduchess Elisabeth Mathilde of Austria (18 March 1935 – 9 October 1998) married Prince Heinrich of Auersperg-Breunner and has issue.
Archduke Andreas Salvator of Austria (28 April 1936) married to Maria de la Piedad Espinosa de los Monteros y Rosillo on 22 April 1936 and later divorced with no issue. Married secondly to Countess Valerie Podstatzky-Liechtenstein with issue.
Archduke Thadaus Salvator of Austria (30 March 2001)
Archduke Casimir Salvator of Austria (27 July 2003)
Archduchess Alicia of Austria (15 February 2005)
Archduchess Josepha Hedwig of Austria (2 September 1937) married Count Clemens von Waldstein with issue.
Archduchess Valerie Isabella of Austria (23 May 1941) married Maximilian, Margrave of Baden, with issue.
Archduchess Maria Alberta of Austria (June 1944) married Baron Alexander von Kottwitz-Erody, with issue.
Archduke Markus Emanuel Salvator of Austria (2 April 1946)
Archduke Johann Maximilian of Austria (18 September 1947) married Annemarie Stummer
Countess Caroline von Habsburg (12 February 1978 – 10 March 2007) died before being upgrade to Archduchess of Austria.
Archduchess Stephanie of Austria (10 July 1979) married Nikolaus von Halgbebauer with issue.
Archduchess Isabella of Austria (3 November 1981)
Archduke Michael Salvator of Austria (born 2 May 1949) married Eva Antonia von Hofmann
Archduchess Maria Christina of Austria (9 November 1997)

Ancestry

References

1894 births
1971 deaths
House of Habsburg-Lorraine
People from Wiener Neustadt-Land District
Knights of the Golden Fleece of Austria
Austrian princes
Tuscan princes